The Zhiben Wetlands is a wetland in Taitung City, Taitung County, Taiwan.

Geography
The wetland is a major habitat for endangered migratory birds.

Transportation
The wetlands is accessible within walking distance south of Zhiben Station of Taiwan Railways.

See also
 List of tourist attractions in Taiwan

References

Landforms of Taitung County
Wetlands of Taiwan